The 1977 New England Patriots season was the franchise's 8th season in the National Football League and 18th overall. The Patriots ended the season with a record of nine wins and five losses, and finished third in the AFC East Division.

Draft

Staff

Roster

Regular season

Schedule 

Note: Intra-division opponents are in bold text.

Game Summaries 
Week 11
Television: CBS
Announcers: Don Criqui, Nick Buoniconti
Steve Grogan passed for two touchdowns in the first half, and the New England defense sacked Philadelphia Eagles quarterback Ron Jaworski eight times as the Patriots keep their faint  playoff hopes alive with their win in front of a regional TV audience. Grogan hit Stanley Morgan on a scoring shot 64 yards in the first period, and then drilled a 16-yard pass to Darryl Stingley for another touchdown in the first half. The Eagles averted a shutout as Jaworski broke out of trouble and passed 12 yards to Charles Smith for a touchdown with just 52 seconds left to play.

Standings

See also 
 New England Patriots seasons

References

New England Patriots
New England Patriots seasons
New England Patriots
Sports competitions in Foxborough, Massachusetts